Hatibari railway station is a railway station on Cuttack–Sambalpur line under the Sambalpur railway division of the East Coast Railway zone. The railway station is situated at Nuamahulpali, Hatibari in Sambalpur district of the Indian state of Odisha.

References

Railway stations in Sambalpur district
Sambalpur railway division